Akzhayik or Akzhaik can refer to:
 Akzhaik, Atyrau, village in Atyrau Region
 Akzhaik District in West Kazakhstan Region
 Akzhayik Nature Reserve, a biosphere reserve in West Kazakhstan Region, see World Network of Biosphere Reserves in Asia and the Pacific
 Akzhayik Sports Club, bandy club from Oral, Kazakhstan
 FC Akzhayik, football club from Oral, Kazakhstan